Marshside is a wetland nature reserve operated by the RSPB in the Marshside area of Southport, Merseyside, England.

The RSPB reserve has two bird hides, the northernmost - named "Sandgrousers' Hide" - serving as a visitor centre. There are also three viewing screens.

The reserve is used by large numbers of overwintering pink footed geese, from Iceland, and wigeon, from Siberia. In summer, species such as avocets and lapwing breed there.

in 2019, the RSPB acquired an adjacent area of wet grassland, Crossens Inner Marsh, in order to extend the reserve.

References

External links 

 

RSPB visitor centres in England
Southport